Church Hill may refer to:

Australia
Church Hill, Sydney

Ireland
Churchill, County Donegal

New Zealand
Church Hill, Nelson

United Kingdom
Church Hill, Derbyshire, England
Church Hill, Staffordshire, England
Church Hill, Northumberland, England
Church Hill, West Midlands, England
Church Hill, West Sussex, England
Church Hill, Worcestershire, England
Church Hill, County Tyrone, a townland in County Tyrone, Northern Ireland
Church Hill, Edinburgh, Scotland
Church Hill, Pembrokeshire, a location in Wales

United States
Church Hill, Alabama
Church Hill, Georgia
Church Hill, Maryland
Church Hill, Mississippi
Church Hill, Pennsylvania, in Mifflin County
Church Hill, Franklin County, Pennsylvania
Church Hill, Tennessee
Church Hill (Lexington, Virginia), a historic plantation house
Church Hill, Richmond, Virginia, a district of Richmond, Virginia

See also 
 Churchill (disambiguation)